Aaron Coundley (born is 18 October 1989, Caerphilly) is a Welsh rugby union player. A prop forward, he currently plays his club rugby for Newport Gwent Dragons having progressed through the Dragons academy. He made his debut for the Dragons 11 October 2008 against Glasgow Warriors.

Coundley has represented the Wales national rugby union team at Under 16, 18's and Under 20 level. He previously played for Blackwood RFC, Cross Keys RFC and Ebbw Vale RFC.

References

External links
Newport Gwent Dragons profile

Rugby union players from Caerphilly
Welsh rugby union players
Dragons RFC players
Newport RFC players
Living people
1989 births
Rugby union props